Attorney General Atkinson may refer to:

John Atkinson, Baron Atkinson (1844–1932), Attorney-General for Ireland
Michael Atkinson (politician) (born 1958), Attorney-General of South Australia

See also
General Atkinson (disambiguation)